The women's elite time trial at the 2021 European Road Championships took place on 9 September 2021, in Trentino, Italy. Nations were allowed to enter a maximum of 2 riders into the event.

Results
Source:

References

Women's elite